The 2014 European Parliament election in France for the election of the 8th delegation from France to the European Parliament took place on 24 May 2014 in the overseas territories of France, and on 25 May 2014 in metropolitan France. The number of seats allocated to France increased to 74, compared to 72 in the 2009 election, as a result of the 2013 reapportionment of seats in the European Parliament.

The members of the European Parliament for France, 2014–2019 were elected.

Previous (2009—2014) MEPs by European Political Group

Opinion polls

Results

by electoral division

References

France
Europe
European Parliament elections in France